Mayophygee Macha (English: Mayophy's Son; also written as Mayophy Gee Macha) is a 1994 Indian Meitei language film written by M. K. Binodini Devi and directed by Oken Amakcham. R.S. Joycee and Makhonmani Mongsaba were cast in the lead roles. It is produced by Thoungamba and Thouyangba for P.K. Films. The movie won the National Film Award for Best Feature Film in Manipuri at the 42nd National Film Awards. It is a celluloid movie.

The movie was mainly shot in Ukhrul.

Synopsis
Mayophy, a lady from a hill district of Manipur, falls in love with Basanta, a guy from Imphal. When she becomes pregnant, Basanta abandons her. She tries to contact him, but to no avail. Kunjo (Mayophy's teacher and Basanta's friend) leaves no stone unturned to help Mayophy but denial becomes the only routine answer for Basanta. She never steps back but raises her son as a lone single mother with all courage and determination. Mayophy's son grows to become a successful sportsperson.

Cast
 R.S. Joycee as Mayophy, Angamla's daughter
 Makhonmani Mongsaba as Kunjo
 Narendra Ningomba as Basanta
 Lourembam Pishak as Sanola, Mayophy's grandmother
 Chan Heisnam as Samfang, Chowkidar
 Wangkhem Lalitkumar as District Collector
 Bimola as Angamla
 Master Nongyai as Mayophy's son
 Gurumayum Ongbi Gunabati as Basanta's mother
 Yengkhom Roma
 Neena
 Kalpana
 Tiken

Accolades
Mayophygee Macha won the National Film Award for Best Feature Film in Manipuri at the 42nd National Film Awards 1995. The citation for the National Award reads, "For a simple story of a rural life in Manipuri handled with a deft mastery over the medium".

External links

References

1994 films
Meitei-language films